Escapexstacy is the debut album of Finnish gothic metal band Poisonblack. It was released on 17 February 2003 in Germany, 25 February 2003 in the United States and Canada, and 8 March 2003 in Japan. Amy Sciarretto gave a favourable review in CMJ New Music Monthly, writing that "Escapexstacy boasts gorgeous and progressive Euro-rock, which never gets too heavy..."

The song "The Exciter" was featured in an episode of Viva la Bam, entitled "Where's Vito?", during a scene where Vito Margera destroys Bam Margera's beloved Hummer via being pushed into a quarry.

Track listing 
 "The Glow of the Flames"– 2:51
 "Love Infernal"– 3:57
 "The State"– 4:56
 "All Else Is Hollow"– 4:02
 "In Lust"– 5:30
 "The Exciter"– 4:29
 "Lay Your Heart to Rest"– 4:24
 "With Her I Die"– 5:20
 "Illusion/Delusion"– 4:24
 "The Kiss of Death"– 4:32

Personnel 
Juha-Pekka Leppäluoto – vocals
Ville Laihiala – guitars
Marco Sneck – keyboards
Janne Kukkonen – bass
Tarmo Kanerva – drums

References 

2003 debut albums
Poisonblack albums
Century Media Records albums
Songs about BDSM